Lepidogma tamaricalis is a species of snout moth. It is found in mainland Italy and on Sardinia, in Asia, including Pakistan, as well as in North Africa and on the Iberian Peninsula.

The larvae feed on Tamarix species. They live in silky nests built on the tops of branches.

References

Moths described in 1873
Epipaschiinae
Moths of Europe